The 1987 California Angels season involved the Angels finishing 6th in the American League west with a record of 75 wins and 87 losses.

Regular season

Season standings

Record vs. opponents

Notable transactions
December 19, 1986: Ron Romanick was traded by the California Angels with a player to be named later to the New York Yankees for a player to be named later and Butch Wynegar.
January 8, 1987: Doug DeCinces was signed as a free agent with the California Angels.
January 22, 1987: Jim Eppard was purchased by the California Angels from the Oakland Athletics.
May 1, 1987: Bob Boone was signed as a free agent with the California Angels.
May 19, 1987: Doug Corbett was signed as a free agent with the California Angels.
June 1, 1987: Greg Minton was signed as a free agent with the California Angels.
June 19, 1987: Doug Corbett was released by the California Angels.
June 22, 1987: Alan Mills was sent by the California Angels to the New York Yankees to complete an earlier deal made on December 19, 1986.
July 28, 1987: Bill Buckner signed as a free agent with the California Angels.
September 15, 1987: John Candelaria was traded by the California Angels to the New York Mets for Jeff Richardson and Shane Young (minors).

Draft picks
June 2, 1987: John Orton was drafted by the California Angels in the 1st round (25th pick) of the 1987 amateur draft.
June 2, 1987: Rubén Amaro, Jr. was drafted by the California Angels in the 11th round of the 1987 amateur draft. Player signed June 16, 1987.

Roster

Player stats

Batting

Starters by position
Note: Pos = Position; G = Games played; AB = At bats; H = Hits; Avg. = Batting average; HR = Home runs; RBI = Runs batted in

Other batters
Note: G = Games played; AB = At bats; H = Hits; Avg. = Batting average; HR = Home runs; RBI = Runs batted in

Starting pitchers 
Note: G = Games pitched; IP = Innings pitched; W = Wins; L = Losses; ERA = Earned run average; SO = Strikeouts

Other pitchers 
Note: G = Games pitched; IP = Innings pitched; W = Wins; L = Losses; ERA = Earned run average; SO = Strikeouts

Relief pitchers 
Note: G = Games pitched; W = Wins; L = Losses; SV = Saves; ERA = Earned run average; SO = Strikeouts

Farm system

References

1987 California Angels at Baseball Reference
1987 California Angels at Baseball Almanac

Los Angeles Angels seasons
Los
Los